The canton of Le Neubourg is an administrative division of the Eure department, northern France. Its borders were modified at the French canton reorganisation which came into effect in March 2015. Its seat is in Le Neubourg.

It consists of the following communes:

Bacquepuis
Bérengeville-la-Campagne
Bernienville
Le Bosc-du-Theil
Brosville
Canappeville
Cesseville
Crestot
Criquebeuf-la-Campagne
Crosville-la-Vieille
Daubeuf-la-Campagne
Écauville
Ecquetot
Émanville
Épégard
Épreville-près-le-Neubourg
Feuguerolles
Graveron-Sémerville
Hectomare
Hondouville
Houetteville
Iville
Mandeville
Marbeuf
Le Mesnil-Fuguet
Le Neubourg
La Pyle
Quittebeuf
Sacquenville
Saint-Aubin-d'Écrosville
Sainte-Colombe-la-Commanderie
Saint-Martin-la-Campagne
Saint-Meslin-du-Bosc
Le Tilleul-Lambert
Tournedos-Bois-Hubert
Tourneville
Le Tremblay-Omonville
Le Troncq
Venon
Villettes
Villez-sur-le-Neubourg
Vitot
Vraiville

References

Cantons of Eure